The Zambian Air Force (ZAF) is the air force of Zambia and the air operations element of the Zambian Defence Force. Following the creation of the Republic of Zambia in 1964, the former Northern Rhodesia Air Force was renamed as the Zambian Air Force.

The primary missions of the Air Force are to defend Zambia's borders and protect its airspace. In addition, it provides various forms of air support to other government departments. It also flies reconnaissance, trooping and transport missions for the police and airlifts medical supplies and personnel to inaccessible areas. Finally, the organisation provides emergency transport whenever needed.

History 
Prior to the demise of the Federation of Rhodesia and Nyasaland, military air operations in the then British protectorate of Northern Rhodesia were provided by the Royal Air Force, and then the Royal Rhodesian Air Force.

The Northern Rhodesia Air Force was established on 1 March 1964, primarily operating in a liaison and transport role. It consisted of two squadrons:

 No. 1 Squadron NRAF operated four Douglas C-47s as well as two Percival Pembrokes.

 No. 2 Squadron NRAF operated eight De Havilland Canada DHC-2 Beavers in a liaison role.

On 24 October 1964, on the date of the establishment of the independent Republic of Zambia, the name of the Northern Rhodesia Air Force was subsequently changed to Zambian Air Force. The early years of the ZAF saw continued close cooperation with the United Kingdom as a supplier of aircraft, and recruiting British officers still was a standard practice. Thanks to deliveries of six de Havilland Canada DHC-1 Chipmunks and other equipment, the Flying Training School was formed. These were followed by five DHC-4A Caribous. Starting in 1966, moving away from the British became a priority, and the ZAF started favouring the purchase of Italian and Yugoslavian aircraft. In this period, deliveries of Agusta-Bell AB.205s allowed for the formation of the ZAF's first helicopter squadron. Other aircraft acquired from Italy included SIAI-Marchetti SF.260s and Aermacchi MB-326GB light attack aircraft. Soko J-21 Jastrebs and Soko G-2 Galebs were delivered by Yugoslavia.

In the late 1970s, relations with China increased in importance. In this period, 12 Shenyang F-5s and FT-5s were delivered, as well as 12 Shenyang F-6s. In September 1980, the USSR started the deliveries of at least 16 MiG-21bis fighters and two MiG-21UM trainers.

Equipment
Few details are available on force deployment, but combat elements are understood to be located at Lusaka (K-8), Mbala (F-6) and Mumbwa (MiG-21), with the small fleet of transport aircraft and utility helicopters also reportedly stationed at Lusaka. Zambia Air Force's JL-10 are equipped with PESA fire control radar along with wingtip rails for PL-5 air-to-air missiles. A 23mm gun pod can be mounted on the centreline. Four hardpoints allow for various ordnance, including 250 and 500kg bombs, HF-18 57mm rocket pods, LS-6 guided bombs or the TL-10/YJ-9E air-to-surface missile.

Current inventory

Air defence systems

Commands
Commands are typically under the leadership of an Air Officer Commanding (AOC) who holds a rank of Brigadier General.
 Strike Command
 Training Command
 Tactical Air Mobility Command
 Logistics Command
 Northern Air Defence Command
 Central Air Defence Command

Formations
No. 65 Wing "Preamonitus Preamonitus "
No. 71 Wing "Defending with valor"

Flying units
 No. 1 Squadron "With excellence"
 No. 8 Squadron "Ready to Move"
 No. 10 Squadron "On eagle wings, we lift"
 No. 11 Squadron "Warrior spirit"
 No. 14 Squadron "Strike Command"
 No. 21 Squadron "Fighting vipers"
 No. 22 Squadron "Anytime Anywhere"
 No. 33 Squadron "Service above self"
 No. 43 Squadron "Poised and ready to strike"

Training units
 Centre for Advanced learning "Learning for proficiency" 
 Zambia Air Force Academy "To learn to defend our country"
 Technical Training School "Strive for excellency"
 Ground training School "Knowledge Efficiency"
 Flying Training School "Nihil Nisi Optima"
 Air Defence School "Excellence through knowledge"

Leadership

Commanders

References

Notes

Bibliography

Air forces by country
Air force
Air force
Military units and formations established in 1968
1968 establishments in Zambia
Military aviation in Africa